The 1894 Western Reserve football team represented Western Reserve University—known as Case Western Reserve University—in the American city of Cleveland, Ohio, during the 1894 college football season. The team's coach was Charles O. Jenkins and captain was Henry Scott Stewart.  The team was managed by future Cleveland Mayor William R. Hopkins. One notable player was Tug Wilson.  Another member for the team was Charles N. Crosby.

The team outscored opponents by a combined 232–8, including defeating John Heisman's Oberlin Yeomen. The football rivalry against Case began with the first ever match up on Thanksgiving and the first time the game was played at League Park.

Schedule

References

Western Reserve
Case Western Reserve Spartans football seasons
College football undefeated seasons
Western Reserve football